California's 55th State Assembly district is one of 80 California State Assembly districts. It is currently represented by Republican Phillip Chen of Yorba Linda.

District profile 
The district straddles the intersection of three counties and several distinct regions. Centered on the Chino Hills, it includes the southeastern margins of the San Gabriel Valley as well as parts of the northern Santa Ana Valley. The district is relatively affluent and primarily suburban.

Los Angeles County – 1.7%
 Diamond Bar
 Industry – 6.4%
 Ramona
 Rowland Heights
 Walnut
 West Covina – 28.7%

Orange County – 7.3%
 Brea
 La Habra
 Placentia
 Yorba Linda

San Bernardino County – 3.7%
 Chino Hills

Election results from statewide races

List of Assembly Members 
Due to redistricting, the 55th district has been moved around different parts of the state. The current iteration resulted from the 2011 redistricting by the California Citizens Redistricting Commission.

Election results 1992 - present

2020

2018

2016

2014

2012

2010

2008

2006

2004

2002

2000

1998

1996

1994

1992

See also 
 California State Assembly
 California State Assembly districts
 Districts in California

References

External links 
 District map from the California Citizens Redistricting Commission

55
Government of Los Angeles County, California
Government in Orange County, California
Government of San Bernardino County, California
Brea, California
Chino Hills (California)
Chino Hills, California
Diamond Bar, California
La Habra, California
Placentia, California
Walnut, California
West Covina, California
Yorba Linda, California